The Dregoviches or Dregovichi  (Belarusian: дрыгавічы, dryhavičy, ;) were one of the tribal unions of Early East Slavs, and inhabited the territories down the stream of the Pripyat River and northern parts of the right bank of the Dnieper river (more exact extents of the tribe's domain are still unknown). The name of the tribe probably derives from the Old Ruthenian word  дрегва or дрягва  (drehva, or dryahva, which means "swamp") because the Dregoviches used to live in the marshlands.

The first known reference to the Dregoviches is in the Primary Chronicle, where they are listed among the twelve tribes. However, there is a reference in the De Administrando Imperio of Constantine Porphyrogenitus to the 'Drugovichians'. Since the reference appears in a passage describing the Drugovichians as one of the Slavic peoples who pay tribute to the Kievan Rus, and they are named alongside the Severians and Krivichians, it seems likely these are the same people. By the 12th century they were assimilated into the main East Slavic peoples.

The chronicles do not tell historians much about the Dregoviches. We only know that they had their own princely rule in the city of Turov. In the 10th century, the lands of the Dregoviches became a part of Kievan Rus and later—the Turov Principality. The northwestern part of the land of the Dregoviches became a part of the Polotsk Principality.

See also
 List of Medieval Slavic tribes

Sources
  De Administrando Imperio of Constantine Porphyrogenitus, ed. R.J. Jenkins, Dumbarton Oaks Center for Byzantine Studies (1967)

References

East Slavic tribes
 
Medieval Belarus
10th century in Kievan Rus'